Oreapolis is an unincorporated community in Cass County, Nebraska, United States.

History
A post office was established at Oreapolis in 1859, and remained in operation until it was discontinued in 1864.

References

Unincorporated communities in Cass County, Nebraska
Unincorporated communities in Nebraska